Naohito lshii (born 25 December 1963) is a Japanese taekwondo practitioner. He competed in the men's finweight at the 1988 Summer Olympics.

References

External links
 

1963 births
Place of birth unknown
Living people
Japanese male taekwondo practitioners
Olympic taekwondo practitioners of Japan
Taekwondo practitioners at the 1988 Summer Olympics
Taekwondo practitioners at the 1986 Asian Games
20th-century Japanese people